Antonio Snider-Pellegrini (1802–1885) was a French geographer and scientist who theorized about the possibility of continental drift, anticipating Wegener's theories concerning Pangaea by several decades.

In 1858, Snider-Pellegrini published his book, La Création et ses mystères dévoilés ("The Creation and its Mysteries Unveiled").  He proposed that all of the continents were once connected together during the Pennsylvanian Period.  He based this theory on the fact that he had found plant fossils in both Europe and the United States that were identical. He found matching fossils on all of the continents.

Also Pellegrini proposed a large change in the Earth's size during the time of the Biblical Genesis account.

Pellegrini was preceded by Abraham Ortelius and followed by Eduard Suess, Roberto Mantovani, Frank Bursley Taylor, and Alfred Wegener as early advocates of continental drift.

References

French geologists
French geographers
1802 births
1885 deaths